Dan Emil Racoțea (born 21 July 1995) is a Romanian handball player who plays for Dinamo București and the Romanian national team. 

He participated in the 2012 European Youth Handball Championship and 2013 Youth World Handball Championship scoring 31 and 52 goals, respectively.

References

External links
Profile on Handball-Talents

1995 births
Living people
Sportspeople from Brașov
Romanian male handball players
Romanian expatriate sportspeople in Poland
Romanian expatriate sportspeople in Hungary
Romanian expatriate sportspeople in France
Expatriate handball players
Wisła Płock (handball) players
Veszprém KC players